This is a list of actors who have appeared on the television series Dalziel and Pascoe.

A
Minna Aaltonen
Robyn Addison as Katherine Hamilton in "Demons on Our Shoulders"
Richard Albrecht as Diver Tom Perriman in "On Beulah Height"
Fiona Allen
Adjoa Andoh as Katie Bevins in "The Dig"
Francesca Annis as Bonnie Fielding in "An Autumn Shroud"
Marc Anwar as Naved Lateef in "The Cave Woman"
William Armstrong as Dr Jeff Waller in "For Love Nor Money"
Ray Ashcroft
James Aubrey as Lord 'Tiger' Harper in "Dead Meat"
Juliet Aubrey as Dr Eleanor Brown in "The Dig"
John Axon as Spinx in "An Autumn Shroud"

B
Nick Bagnall as Tommy Maggs in "A Killing Kindness"
Marion Bailey as Lorraine Wildgoose in "A Killing Kindness"
Robin Bailey as Hereward Fielding in "An Autumn Shroud"
Alex Baillie-Hamilton as Officer Baxter in "The British Grenadier"
Patrick Baladi
James Bannon as Tony in "Time to Go"
Frances Barber as Amanda 'Cap' Marvell in "The Wood Beyond"
Paul Barber as Clive Griffin in "Houdini's Ghost"
Ashley Barker
Tim Barker as Helicopter Camera Operator in "On Beulah Height"
James Barron as Solicitor in "The Cave Woman"
Keith Barron
Clifford Barry
Ivana Basic
Stephen Beckett
Geoffrey Beevers
Michael Begley as Carl Watmough in "Heads You Lose"
Joe Belcher
Aran Bell as Young Oliver Fisher in "Recalled to Life"
David Bell as James Hamilton in "Demons on Our Shoulders"
Jessica Bell as Perdy in "Under Dark Stars"
Michael Bell as PC Nobby Clark in "The British Grenadier"
Tom Bell as Oliver Fisher in "Recalled to Life"
Lynda Bellingham as Jess Pitman in "Great Escapes"
John Benfield
Tiana Benjamin
Tracie Bennett as Grace Beck in "Project Aphrodite"
Annette Bentley as Lindsey Wilson in "The Price of Fame"
Naomi Bentley as WPC 'Janet' Jackson in "Heads You Lose", "Dead Meat", "The Dig" and "Dust Thou Art"
Mark Benton as Jonathan Etherege in "Ruling Passion"
Sanjeev Bhaskar
Ace Bhatti
Denise Black as Peta Sinclair in "Demons on Our Shoulders"
David Blair as Herbert Batty in "The Wood Beyond"
Isla Blair
Katie Blake as Ada Pascoe in "The Wood Beyond"
Sean Blowers as Ronny Marnham in "Dead Meat"
Peter Blythe as Supt Derek Backhouse in "Ruling Passion"
Lee Boardman as Sgt Brian Skinner in "A Game of Soldiers"
Pierre Bokma as DI Hans Boersma in "Wrong Time, Wrong Place"
James Bolam as Father Tibbings in "Sins of the Fathers"
Mark Bonnar
Neil Boorman
Antony Booth
Christine Bottomley as Christine Fitzgerald in "For Love Nor Money"
John Bowe as Bill Walker in "Houdini's Ghost"
Stephen Boxer
Moya Brady as Karen Bennett in "Under Dark Stars"
John Branwell as Arnie Stringer in "Bones and Silence"
Catherine Breeze as Jenny Armstrong in "Heads You Lose"
Cathy Breeze
Rebecca Bridges as Rosie Pascoe in "Dead Meat" and "Guardian Angel"
Joy Brook as Stella Mycroft in "Under World"
Paul Brooke as Canon Eustice Horncastle in "Bones and Silence"
Inga Brooksey as Amy Mansfield in "Heads You Lose"
Michael Brophy as Martin Pearce in "Under Dark Stars"
Ralph Brown
Susan Brown as ACC Alex Lawrence in "The Price of Fame"
Lorraine Bruce as Maggie Ruddlesdin in "The Cave Woman"
Emily Bruni as Tamzin Court in "Demons on Our Shoulders"
Graham Bryan as Zachary Graham in "Time to Go"
Colin Buchanan
Niall Buggy as Drummond Sachs in "Fallen Angel"
Amelia Bullmore as Frances Cunningham in "Project Aphrodite"
David Burke as Paul Boddison in "Dust Thou Art"
John Burton as Recruiting Sergeant in "The Wood Beyond"
Josephine Butler as Andrea Valentine in "A Killing Kindness"
Paul Butterworth as Vicar in "A Killing Kindness" and "A Death in the Family"
Bruce Byron

C
Burt Caesar as Philip Jacklin in "Recalled to Life"
David Calder
Anna Calder-Marshall as Anna Wisley in "Dust Thou Art"
Anthony Calf as Joe Furst in "Project Aphrodite"
Andrew Callaway as Det Sgt Hamblin in "Ruling Passion"
Cheryl Campbell as Jean Swainbank in "Fallen Angel"
Earl Cameron as Arthur Nolan in "Houdini's Ghost"
Nicholas Camm
Joan Campion as Rosemary Grainger in "The British Grenadier"
Nancy Carroll as Samantha Mantell in "Demons on Our Shoulders"
Clive Carter as Peter Mayhew in "Under Dark Stars"
Katy Cavanagh as DS Dawn Milligan in "A Game of Soldiers", "The Price of Fame", "Great Escapes" and "Soft Touch"
Christopher Cazenove as Guy Latimer in "Dead Meat"
Justin Chadwick as DC Seymour in "Bones and Silence"
Janys Chambers as Karen Dacre in "On Beulah Height"
Steve Chaplin as Ben Culton / Jamie Henshaw in "Fallen Angel"
Brendan Charleson as Eddie Summers in "The Cave Woman"
Tom Charnock as Dr George Appleton in "Sins of the Fathers"
Yao Chin
Navin Chowdhry as Police Cadet Sanjay Singh in "Ruling Passion" and "A Killing Kindness"
Chipo Chung as Layla Jadwin in "Project Aphrodite"
Stephen Churchett
Angela Clerkin as Liz Reid / Helen Hobbs in "Project Aphrodite"
Rob Collier as Simon Thewlis in "The Cave Woman"
Amelia Curtis as Rebecca Stevens in "A Death in the Family"
Sam Curtis as Paul Victor in "The Cave Woman"
Warren Clarke
Anna Clarkson as Shirley Appleyard in "Bones and Silence"
Jeremy Clarkson
Keith Clifford
Claude Close
Graham Colclough as Doctor Curtis in "On Beulah Height"
Michael Coles as Papworth in "An Autumn Shroud"
Martin Cookson as Vicar in "The British Grenadier"
Garry Cooper
Trevor Cooper as Geordie Turnbull in "On Beulah Height"
Paul Copley
Susannah Corbett as Ellie Pascoe recurring from "An Autumn Shroud", "Ruling Passion", "A Killing Kindness", "Under World", "Bones and Silence", "The Wood Beyond", "On Beulah Height", "Recalled to Life", "Time to Go" and "Dead Meat"
James Corden as Ben Forsythe in "The Price of Fame"
Emily Corrie as Zoe Patterson in "Time to Go"
George Costigan
Oliver Cotton as Keith Henshaw in "Great Escapes"
Lindsey Coulson as Sue Blackstone in "Sins of the Fathers"
Frances Cox as Mrs Sharman in "Child's Play"
Richard Coyle as Martin Hallingsworth in "A Sweeter Lazarus"
Kenneth Cranham
David Crellin as Bob Barnes in "For Love Nor Money"
Bernard Cribbins as Uncle Henry in "Time to Go"
Phil Croft as Search Co-ordinator in "On Beulah Height"
Ben Crompton as Olly in "The Wood Beyond"
Howard Crossley
Garry Crystal as Darren in "A Killing Kindness"
Ian Cullen
Jonathan Cullen
Emma Cunniffe
Ian Curtis as DC Dean Sheldon in "For Love Nor Money"
Sorcha Cusack

D
David Daker as Jack Turton in "A Sweeter Lazarus"
Jennifer Daley as Receptionist in "A Death in the Family"
Krassimir Damianov as No Nose / Ismail Medmedov in "The Dig"
Ellen ten Damme as Frida Aalst in "Wrong Time, Wrong Place"
Joanna David as Chloe Wulfstan in "On Beulah Height"
Meg Davies as Marianne Culpepper in "Ruling Passion"
Rachel Davies as Sandra McNally in "Fallen Angel"
Stacy Davies
Lucy Davis
Julia Deakin
Jack Deam as Charlie Walker in "Great Escapes"
Jack Dee
Jacqueline Defferary as Pamela Waterson in "Bones and Silence"
Louise Delamere as Tracey Baxter in "Wrong Time, Wrong Place"
Robert Demeger as Charlie Forbes in "Time to Go"
Sally Dexter as Pauline Parker in "Guardian Angel"
Amita Dhiri as WDC Shaz Kendall in "A Sweeter Lazarus"
Sandra Dickinson
Oliver Dimsdale as Danny Latimer in "Dead Meat"
Reece Dinsdale as Iain Pyke in "The Cave Woman"
 Rob Dixon as Jamie Blackstone in "Sins of the Fathers"
Russell Dixon as Harold Satterthwaite in "Under World"
Pip Donaghy as Det Sgt Cross in "An Autumn Shroud"
Elaine Donnelly as Susan Goodman in "Guardian Angel"
Michelle Dockery as Aimee Hobbs in "Project Aphrodite"
Branwell Donaghey as Matt Hurley in "Project Aphrodite"
Shaun Dooley as Robert Pascoe in "The Wood Beyond"
Deirdre Doone as Mrs Fairclough in "The Wood Beyond"
Kevin Doyle as Adam Bolt in "Project Aphrodite"
Elize du Toit
Sharon Duce as Jenny Challoner in "Dead Meat"
Andrew Dunn
Marcelle Duprey
Nathaniel Duncan as Tommy Dickinson in "Under World"
Jacqueline Dutoit as Mrs Graham in "Time to Go"
Joe Duttine as Colin Farr in "Under World"
John Duttine as Danny Macer in "For Love Nor Money"
Clint Dyer as Tarzan / Keith Gibson in "The Dig"
Kevin Dyer as Leon Pilger in "A Sweeter Lazarus"

E
Vanessa Earl
Rob Edwards as Ben Edwards in "Guardian Angel"
Hazel Ellerby as Jacquie Whiting in "Soft Touch"
Susan Engel as Princess in "The Dig"
Christine Entwisle as Fiona Gilks in "A Sweeter Lazarus"
Daniel Evans as Rob Miclean in "Houdini's Ghost"
Tenniel Evans

F
David Fahm
Emma Fallon as young Mary Wolfstan in "On Beulah Height"
Abigail Fawcett as Lorraine Dacre in "On Beulah Height"
Olegario Fedoro as Dentist in "Time to Go"
Shirley Anne Field as Cissy Kohler in "Recalled to Life"
Jim Findley
Siobhan Finneran as Susie Ferdinand in "Dust Thou Art"
Marc Finn as Ted in "Time to Go"
Ian Fitzgibbon as Sillitoe in "The British Grenadier"
Lucy Flack as Young Jenny Huddlestone in "Dead Meat"
David Fleeshman as Pedro Pedley in "Under World"
 John Flitcroft as PC John Shepherd in "Sins of the Fathers"
Barbara Flynn
Judy Flynn as Karen Clark in "The Price of Fame"
Keeley Forsyth as DC Carrie Harris in "Sins of the Fathers" and "For Love Nor Money"
Wayne Foskett as Lord Lucan / Harry Simms in "The Dig"
Iain Fraser as Govan in "Bones and Silence"
Jonny Freeman as Robin Challoner in "Dead Meat"
Michael French as Gary Lescott in "Wrong Time, Wrong Place"
Christopher Fulford as Terry Parker in "Guardian Angel"

G
Hayley Garbett as young Betsy Allgood in "On Beulah Height"
Angie Garnett as Kelly Knightley in "Houdini's Ghost"
Steve Garti
Ruth Gemmell as Rachel Waller in "For Love Nor Money"
Sally George as Cashman's Solicitor in "The Dig"
Tom Georgeson as Jack Allgood in "On Beulah Height"
Alex Giannini as Det Insp Stubbs in "Recalled to Life"
Joyce Gibbs as Elderly Lady in "Time to Go"
Debra Gillett
Georgie Glen
Nicholas Gleaves as Sam Mattis in "Soft Touch"
Jamie Glover as Rod Lomas in "Child's Play"
Kate Godfrey as Young Mavis Marsh in "Recalled to Life"
Carmen Gómez as Rosetta Stanhope in "A Killing Kindness"
Stella Gonet as Christine Webster in "Guardian Angel"
Henry Goodman
Paul Goodwin as Austin Greenall in "A Killing Kindness"
Stuart Goodwin as Miles Turton in "A Sweeter Lazarus"
Burn Gorman as Jerry Hart in "A Death in the Family"
Julie Graham as Adi Pritchard in "A Killing Kindness"
Gawn Grainger as Eden Thackeray in "Child's Play" and "Bones and Silence"
Richard E Grant as Lee Knight in "Demons on Our Shoulders"
Pippa Guard as Elizabeth Fitzgerald in "For Love Nor Money"
Jane Guernier as Susan Decker in "The Cave Woman"
Margo Gunn as Sarah Johnson in "Demons on Our Shoulders"
Jane Gurnett as Pam Johnstone in "Dust Thou Art"
Melanie Gutteridge
Haydn Gwynne as Dr McKenzie Mansfield in "Heads You Lose"
Joanna van Gyseghem as Mrs Dorothy Horncastle in "Bones and Silence"

H
Stephen Hackett as Ron Ludlam in "A Killing Kindness"
Kenneth Hadley as Solicitor in "The Wood Beyond"
Garrick Hagon
David Haig as David Hallingsworth in "A Sweeter Lazarus"
Neil Haigh as Paul Hobbs in "The Dig"
Jill Halfpenny
Christopher John Hall
Peter Halliday
Sebastian Harcombe as Michael Wheeler in "Under Dark Stars"
Jamie Harding as Sam Wiseman in "Project Aphrodite"
Jessica Harper as Nicki Walker in "Great Escapes"
Davyd Harries as Angus Pelman in "Ruling Passion"
Mali Harries as Young Cissy Kohler in "Recalled to Life"
Laurence Harrington as James Palfrey in "Ruling Passion"
Richard Harrington as Gary Mileham in "Heads You Lose"
Kelly Harrison
Richard Hawley as Mark Wildgoose in "A Killing Kindness"
Rachel Hayden as Melinda Miller in "Heads You Lose"
Tony Haygarth as Michael Veitch in "Guardian Angel"
Pippa Haywood as Assistant Chief Constable Rebecca Fenning in "A Sweeter Lazarus"
James Hazeldine
Sam Hazeldine as Sean Doherty in "Dust Thou Art"
Jane Hazlegrove as Kay Simms in "The Dig"
Tim Healy as Mike Pitman in "Great Escapes"
Mark Heap as Julian Finch in "The Price of Fame"
Paul Heasman
Roger Heathcott as Judge Brack in "Bones and Silence"
Jack Hedley as Alessandro Pontelli in "Child's Play"
Polly Hemingway as May Farr in "Under World"
Zoe Henry 
Douglas Henshall as Tony Watson in "Dust Thou Art"
Karen Henthorn as Claudine Griffin (Pathologist) in "A Death in the Family"
Julie Hesmondhalgh as Wendy Walker in "The Wood Beyond"
Brian Hibbard as Nye Pritchard in "The British Grenadier"
Derek Hicks as Gavin Mycroft in "Under World"
Beverly Hills
Paul Hilton as Oliver Taylor in "Demons on Our Shoulders"
Frazer Hines
Jemma Hines as PC Baines in "Fallen Angel" and "Under Dark Stars"
Gerry Hinks
Kiran Hocking
Michael Hodgson as Dr Stephen Weston in "Sins of the Fathers"
Kelli Hollis as Bridget Croft in "Under Dark Stars"
Duncan Holmes as George Tesman in "Bones and Silence"
Gerard Horan as Jim Webster in "Guardian Angel"
Carmel Howard as Mavis Uniff in "An Autumn Shroud" and as Hedda in "Bones and Silence"
Debbie Howard
Robert Hudson
Glenn Hugill as Charlie Tillotson in "An Autumn Shroud"
Anthony Hunt as Hank Uniff in "An Autumn Shroud"
Ava Hunt as Female Reporter in "Recalled to Life"
Kelly Hunter as Laura MacAlpine in "Guardian Angel"
Eunice Huthart as Jenny Mills in "The Cave Woman"
Connie Hyde

I
Hosh Ibraham as Cliff Sharman in "Child's Play"
William Ilkley as DCI Derek Hawes in "The Price of Fame"
Celia Imrie
Ralph Ineson as James Maddern in "The Cave Woman"
Lee Ingleby as Kieron Cumming in "The British Grenadier"
Adrian Irvine as Dr Marwood in "Bones and Silence"
George Irving as Robin Blake / Stuart Mills in "The Dig"

J
Paula Jacobs
Michael J. Jackson
Oliver Jackson as Kevin Jennings in "Under Dark Stars"
Steve Jackson as John Hobbs in "The Dig"
Jennifer James as PC Kim Spicer in "Houdini's Ghost", "Wrong Time, Wrong Place", "Guardian Angel", "A Death in the Family", "The Cave Woman", "Fallen Angel", "Project Aphrodite" and "Under Dark Stars"
Susan Jameson
Rob James-Collier
Rob Jarvis
Sue Jenkins as Sophie Barron in "The Cave Woman"
Christie Jennings as Clinic Receptionist in "Recalled to Life"
Peter de Jersey as William Courtney in "Dead Meat"
Dominic Jephcott
Karl Johnson as Stevie Earle in "Soft Touch"
Freddie Jones as French in "Ruling Passion"
Maggie Jones as Ena Cooper in "A Killing Kindness"
Paterson Joseph
Patterson Joseph as Mr Alisdair Collinson in "Heads You Lose"
Emily Joyce as Natalie Lawson in "Fallen Angel"

K
Wolf Kahler
Hosh Kane
Miriam Karlin as Judith Bateman in "Heads You Lose"
Beatrice Kelley as Mrs Elsie Coe in "On Beulah Height"
Sheila Kelley as Mrs Sorby in "A Killing Kindness"
Craig Kelly as Eddie Wilcox in "Fallen Angel"
Gerard Kelly
Sue Kelly as Lynne Pearce in "Under Dark Stars"
Merelina Kendall as Woman Traveller in "Recalled to Life"
James Kennedy as Bobby Slater in "On Beulah Height"
Patricia Kerrigan as Stella Moon in "The British Grenadier"
Claire King as Louise Russell in "The Price of Fame"
Jacqueline Kington
Jeffery Kissoon as Mr Graham in "Time to Go"
Michael Kitchen as Philip Swain in "Bones and Silence"
Ken Kitson as Jack Sorby in "A Killing Kindness"
Asif Khan as Ehsan Khan in "A Death in the Family"
Alex Knight as PC Neilson in "A Sweeter Lazarus"
Rosalind Knight as Brigid Stewart in "The British Grenadier"
Sally Knyvette
Victoria Korner as Rose Hopkins in "Ruling Passion"
Jeroen Krabbé as Det Supt Wim de Kuiper in "Wrong Time, Wrong Place"

L
Bruno Langley as Jason Parker in "Guardian Angel"
Bernard Latham
Helen Latham as Sally Craig in "Great Escapes"
Anna Lauren as Katie Donovan in "Dead Meat"
James Laurenson as Richard Mattis in "Soft Touch"
Jon Laurimore
Kelly Lawrence
Charles Lawson as Charles Stubbs in "A Game of Soldiers"
Denis Lawson as John Barron in "The Cave Woman"
Rad Lazar
Derek Lea
Francis Lee as Soldier in "The Wood Beyond"
Moir Leslie as Monica Clements in "A Sweeter Lazarus"
Anton Lesser as Paul Goodman in "Guardian Angel"
Rhoda Lewis as Mrs Stevens in "The British Grenadier"
John Lightbody as Ben Sharp in "Project Aphrodite"
Jonathan Linsley as Clive Jacobs in "The Dig"
Derren Litten as Mad Dog in "The Dig"
Roger Lloyd-Pack as Bishop Halliwell in "Sins of the Fathers"
Phyllis Logan as DS Jenny Ettrick in "A Game of Soldiers"
Charlotte Longfield as Lecturer in "A Death in the Family"
Laura Lonsdale as Jane Kimber in "Under Dark Stars"
Tom Lorcan as Young John Barron in "The Cave Woman"
Cherie Lunghi as Kay Miclean in "Houdini's Ghost"
Finbar Lynch as Dave Cashman in "The Dig"
Susan Lynch as Dr Janet Rix in "The Dig"
Richard Lynson as Seger's Assistant in "The Wood Beyond"

M
David MacCreedy as Saul Axton in "Dead Meat"
Niall MacGregor as David Sargent in "Demons on Our Shoulders"
Jonathan Magnanti
Art Malik as Aahil Khan in "A Death in the Family"
Philip Manikum as Det Sgt Crowther in "Ruling Passion"
William Mannering as Nigel Fielding in "An Autumn Shroud"
Tom Manners as TV Reporter in "The Dig"
Sara Markland
Linda Marlowe as Stephanie Windibanks in "Child's Play"
Keith Marsh
Bryan Marshall as Terry Brakespeare in "Sins of the Fathers"
Rocky Marshall as Jason Chapman in "Houdini's Ghost"
Barbara Marten as Louise Roach in "Project Aphrodite"
Peter Martin
Emil Marwa as Brandon Taylor in "The Price of Fame"
Vincent Marzello as Noah Seger in "The Wood Beyond"
Bob Mason as Arthur Downey in "Under World"
Sally Ann Matthews
Joseph Mawle as Charlie Barron in "The Cave Woman"
Rupam Maxwell as Timmo Mansfield in "Ruling Passion"
Bill Maynard
John McArdle as Matthew Davis in "The Price of Fame"
Vinnie McCabe as Patrick Drury in "The British Grenadier"
Andrew McCulloch as Sam Dixon in "Ruling Passion"
Philip McGinley as Private Frank Ellerby in "A Game of Soldiers"
Danny McGrath
Victor McGuire as Dave Green in "Dust Thou Art"
Pauline McLynn
John Melainey 
Tony Melody
John Michie as Andrew Goodenough in "Child's Play"
Rosie Millar as Rosie Pascoe in "On Beulah Height" and "Recalled to Life"
Jim Millea as Police Sergeant in "Under World" and as Tom Dacre in "On Beulah Height"
Martin Milman as Neville Watmough in "Under World"
Kirsty Mitchell as Nurse Shannon Hayes in "Heads You Lose"
Steve Money as Davis in "The Wood Beyond"
Josh Moran as Howard Geary in "For Love Nor Money"
Joseph Morton as Carlo in "Ruling Passion"
Dina Mousawi as Maureen Brighouse in "A Killing Kindness"
Gerard Murphy as Steven Burlow in "Demons on Our Shoulders"
Tim Murphy as Mark Bell in "A Game of Soldiers"
Ruaraidh Murray as Boris Waddell in "Time to Go"
Damian Myerscough as Harold Park in "Bones and Silence"

N
Simon Nagra as Hashim Kareem in "A Death in the Family"
John Navagam as CPS Lawyer in "The Dig"
Neil Newbon as E.T. in "Time to Go"
Holly Newman as Lab Assistant in "The Wood Beyond"
Simon Nock as PC Hector in "Time to Go"
Reece Noi as Dean Bennett in "Under Dark Stars"
André Arend van de Noord as Hendricks in "Wrong Time, Wrong Place"
Will Norris as PC Phil Higson in "The Dig"

O
Elizabeth Ann O'Brien as Pauline Stanhope in "A Killing Kindness"
Kieran O'Brien as Chris Mattis in "Soft Touch"
Richard O'Callaghan as Aidan Scarman in "Project Aphrodite"
Peter McNeil O'Connor as Fred in "Under Dark Stars"
Joseph O'Conor as Wally Tallantire in "Recalled to Life"
Fergus O'Donnell as Adam Norton in "Under Dark Stars"
Lesley Clare O'Neill as Audrey Milligan in "Soft Touch"
William Oliver
Stuart Ong as Han in "Dead Meat"
Amanda Orton
Anne Orwin as Mrs Erskine in "Time to Go"
Sophie Osborne as Kirsten Thomas in "Dust Thou Art"

P
Louise Papillon as Mrs Saltaire in "On Beulah Height"
Alison Pargeter as barmaid in "A Game of Soldiers"
Lucy Pargeter
Craig Parkinson
Bhasker Patel
Diana Payan as Mary in "Dead Meat"
Tessa Peake-Jones as Emma Collins in "Dust Thou Art"
Fred Pearson as Dr Vickery in "A Killing Kindness", "Child's Play", "The Wood Beyond", "Recalled to Life" and "Time to Go"
Ian Peck
Bean Peel as Mandy Phillips in "The Cave Woman"
Vince Pellegrino as Dan Cordeski in "A Killing Kindness"
Olive Pendleton as Mavis Sturgeon in "Ruling Passion"
Michael Pennington as Hartley Culpepper in "Ruling Passion"
Robert Perkins
Wayne Perrey as DC Parvez Lateef in "Heads You Lose", "Dead Meat", "The Dig", "Dust Thou Art", "Houdini's Ghost", "Wrong Time, Wrong Place", "Guardian Angel", "A Death in the Family" and "The Cave Woman"
Alistair Petrie as Young James Westropp in "Recalled to Life"
Leslie Phillips as James Westropp in "Recalled to Life"
Marc Pickering as Sammy Hogarth in "Fallen Angel"
Ronald Pickup as Walter Wulfstan in "On Beulah Height"
Gary Pillai as Magnus Tozier in "The Cave Woman"
Nicholas Pinnock
Ian Pirie as Jake Hawkins in "A Game of Soldiers"
Robin Pirongs as Derek Purlingstone in "On Beulah Height"
Tim Plester
Richard Plumley as Billy Huddlestone in "Dead Meat"
Eva Pope as Jane Caulfield in "Guardian Angel"
Andrew Lee Potts as Nicholas Richmond in "Time to Go"
Sarah-Jane Potts as Sophie Richmond in "Time to Go"
Robert Powell as Barry Jemmerson in "Heads You Lose"
Tim Preece as Neville Staybrass in "A Sweeter Lazarus"
Claire Price as Clare Higgins in "A Death in the Family"
Bryan Pringle as John Huby in "Child's Play"
Rupert Procter as Mark Tatton in "Dust Thou Art"
David Prosho as Jimmy Howard in "The Wood Beyond"
James Puddephatt as Dr Paul Ashurst in "Sins of the Fathers", "For Love Nor Money", "Great Escapes", "Soft Touch" and "Fallen Angel"
Ian Puleston-Davies as Paul Pitman in "Great Escapes"

Q
Diana Quick as ACC Stella Applegarth in "For Love Nor Money"

R
Matthew Radford as Colin Hopkins in "Ruling Passion"
Malcolm Raeburn as Chief Constable Trimble in "Bones and Silence"
Jo Rafferty as Cleaner in "Time to Go"
Philip Ralph as Uniformed Policeman in "Under World"
Sakuntala Ramanee as Sameen Lateef in "The Cave Woman"
TJ Ramini
Steve Ramsden as Billy Moyes in "The Dig"
Mary Jo Randle as Moira Henshaw in "Fallen Angel"
Andy Rashleigh
Raad Rawi
Jeff Rawle
Adrian Rawlins
Nicholas Rawlinson as Philip Westropp in "Recalled to Life"
Chloe Read as Nan Seton in "Under Dark Stars"
Andrew Readman
Jimmy Reddington as Arthur Batty in "The Wood Beyond"
Martin Reeve as Alistair Mulgan in "A Killing Kindness"
Anne Reid as Harriet Clifford in "Sins of the Fathers"
Guy Rhys
Laurence Richardson
Russell Richardson as Young Wally Tallantire in "Recalled to Life"
Derek Riddell as Mark Croft in "Under Dark Stars"
Jannine Ridge as TV Reporter in "Recalled to Life"
Richard Ridings as Trevor Nesbitt in "Great Escapes"
Eamonn Riley as Sam Hunmanby in "A Killing Kindness"
Carol Robb as June Aubrey in "Under Dark Stars"
Amy Robbins as Deborah Mattis in "Soft Touch"
Chrissy Rock as Annie Greave in "An Autumn Shroud"
Iain Rogerson as Club Barman in "Child's Play"
Marcus Romer as Vicar in "Child's Play"
Marcus Romer as Ray Marsdon in "A Death in the Family"
Mark Roper as PC Pat Conway in "Houdini's Ghost"
Hugh Ross as Andrew Caulfield in "Guardian Angel"
Willie Ross
Chris Rowe as Vince Kilcline in "Soft Touch"
John Rowe
Rosie Rowell
Bridgitta Roy as Dr Priya Santham in "Under Dark Stars"
David Royle as Det Sgt Edgar Wield recurring from "An Autumn Shroud", "Ruling Passion", "A Killing Kindness", "Under World", "Child's Play", "Bones and Silence", "The Wood Beyond", "On Beulah Height", "Recalled to Life", "Time to Go", "The British Grenadier", "A Sweeter Lazarus", "Secrets of the Dead", "The Unwanted", "Sins of the Fathers" and "For Love Nor Money"
David Rubin as Prison Warder in "A Sweeter Lazarus"
Sheila Ruskin
Thomas Russell as David Batty in "The Wood Beyond"
Amanda Ryan
Daniel Ryan as Bertie Fielding in "An Autumn Shroud"
 Jack Ryan as Declan Roach in "Project Aphrodite"
Emma Rydal as Lesley in "The British Grenadier"
Patrick Ryecart as Anton Davenant in "Ruling Passion"

S
Cathy Sara as Lexie Huby in "Child's Play"
Zita Sattar as Louise Hepburn in "Houdini's Ghost"
Joe Savino as Dr Frank Mason in "A Game of Soldiers",  "The Price of Fame", "Heads You Lose", "Dead Meat", "Dust Thou Art", "Houdini's Ghost", "Wrong Time, Wrong Place", "The Cave Woman" and "Under Dark Stars"
Prunella Scales
Nicholas Selby as Major Studholme in "The Wood Beyond"
John Sessions
Shaughan Seymour as Ike Ogilby in "Child's Play"
Madhav Sharma
Paul Sharma as Imad Abdullah in "A Death in the Family"
Helen Sheals
Steve John Shepherd as Steve Pitt in "A Death in the Family"
Adele Silva
Josette Simon as Eileen Anstiss in "Bones and Silence"
Paul Simpson as Ian in "A Killing Kindness"
Irene Skillington
Michael Skyers as Othello in "Child's Play"
Robin Soans
David Soul as Gus D'Amato in "A Game of Soldiers"
Mark Spalding
Walter Sparrow as Harry Barstow in "The British Grenadier"
Flora Spencer-Longhurst as Lisa Johnstone in "Dust Thou Art"
Barry Stanton as Joe Swindles in "Bones and Silence"
Alison Steadman as Marion Mattis in "Soft Touch"
Johanna ter Steege as Dt Sgt Anna Breukink in "Wrong Time, Wrong Place"
Jo-Anne Stockham as DC Shirley Novello in "On Beulah Height" and "The British Grenadier"
Martin Stone
Philip Stone
Hannah Storey as Jemma Earle in "Soft Touch"
Jon Strickland as DCI Baldestone in "An Autumn Shroud"
Donald Sumpter as Gus Mullavey in "A Sweeter Lazarus"
Richard Sutton as Greg Hines in "Under Dark Stars"
Alison Swann as Tracy Pitman in "Great Escapes"
Steve Sweeney as Snake in "Time to Go"
Jeremy Swift
Clare Swinburne as Pamela Westropp in "Recalled to Life"
Rob Swinton as Museum Guard in "The Wood Beyond"
Sylvia Syms as Maisie Barron in "The Cave Woman"

T
Catherine Terris as Mrs Stringer / Beverley King in "Bones and Silence"
Bill Thomas as Phil Cooper in "The Cave Woman"
Ian Thompson
James Thornton as Hugh Shadwell in "A Death in the Family"
Andrew Tiernan as Jake McNally in "Fallen Angel"
Malcolm Tierney as DCC Raymond in "Child's Play", "On Beulah Height", "Recalled to Life", "Time to Go" and "The British Grenadier"
Darren Tighe
Ben Tillett as Young Latimer in "Dead Meat"
Danielle Tilley as Brenda Sorby in "A Killing Kindness"
Ricky Tomlinson as Rowan Priestley in "The Price of Fame"
Stephen Tompkinson as Brian Fairmile in "Guardian Angel"
Christine Tremarco as Nerissa Barron in "The Cave Woman"
Simon Trinder as Todd Fletcher in "Fallen Angel"
Martin Troakes as Glen Priddy in "Dead Meat"
Darren Tunstall as Roy Daynes in "The Price of Fame"
Andrew Turner as Private Kevin Gillman in "A Game of Soldiers"
Gideon Turner as Young Thomas Partridge in "Recalled to Life"
Graham Turner as Frank Fyles in "Great Escapes"
Margaret Tyzack as Ella Keech in "Child's Play"

V
Zubin Varla
James Vaughan as Lt Col James Hartley in "A Game of Soldiers"
Dorothy Vernon
John Vine as Monty Boyle in "Under World"
Teo-Wa Vuong as Maria Chan in "Dead Meat"

W
Julian Wadham as Richard Johnstone in "Dust Thou Art"
Amanda Walker as Mavis Marsh in "Recalled to Life"
Eugene Walker as Gravedigger in "Child's Play"
Nicola Walker as Abbie Hallingsworth in "A Sweeter Lazarus"
Deka Walmsley as Kevin Hogarth in "Fallen Angel"
Harriet Walter as Mary Waddell in "Time to Go"
Elliot Walton-Frew as Freddie Moon in "The British Grenadier"
Frederick Warder
Alexander Warner as Young Lord Harper in "Dead Meat"
Veda Warwick
Dennis Waterman as Frank Moon in "The British Grenadier"
Jodie Watson as WPC in "Time to Go"
Danny Webb as Deputy Chief Constable Geoff Hiller in "Recalled to Life"
Honeysuckle Weeks
Thushani Weerasekera
Biddy Wells as Roberta James in "A Death in the Family"
Ingrid Wells
David Westhead
Debora Weston as Nancy D'Amato in "A Game of Soldiers"
Robert Whelan as Moffat in "Under World"
Gary Whitaker as Mark Heathfield in "Dust Thou Art"
Jodie Whittaker as Kirsty Richards in "Fallen Angel"
Peter Wight as Charles Johnson in "Demons on Our Shoulders"
Geoffrey Wilkinson as Desk Sergeant in "Bones and Silence"
Paul Williams as Medwin in "Bones and Silence"
Simon Williams as Sir Thomas Partridge in "Recalled to Life"
Dean Williamson as Kieran Roach in "Project Aphrodite"
Sean Wilson as Ken Lawson in "Fallen Angel"
Peter Wingfield as Dave Simmonds in"Wrong Time, Wrong Place"
Sophie Winkleman as Alice Shadwell in "A Death in the Family"
Norman Wisdom
Susannah Wise as Louise Fielding in "An Autumn Shroud"
Katherine Wogan as Doctor in "Time to Go"
Jane Wood as Vanda Dewhurst in "The Cave Woman"
Kathleen Worth as Mrs Simpson in "Great Escapes"
Kaye Wragg as Betsy Allgood (Elizabeth Wulfstan) in "On Beulah Height"
Angus Wright as Greg Waterson in "Bones and Silence"
Gillian Wright as Pat Richardson in "A Death in the Family"
Jerome J Wright as Lang in "Recalled to Life"
Philip Wright as Colin Armstrong in "Heads You Lose"

Y
Marjorie Yates as Angela Veitch in "Guardian Angel"
David Yelland
Hannah Yelland as Helen Chapman in "Houdini's Ghost"
Jimmy Yuill as Robert MacAlpine in "Guardian Angel"

Z
Shane Zaza as Rayn Khan in "A Death in the Family"
Lidija Zovkic as Natalia Chevlikin in "Soft Touch"
Bill Turnbull
Natasha Kaplinsky
Peter Rnic

External links
 Dalziel and Pascoe on IMDb

Dalziel and Pascoe
Dalziel and Pascoe